Microphallus nicolli is a species of digenean parasite in the genus Microphallus. Recorded hosts include the marsh rice rat (Oryzomys palustris) in a saltmarsh at Cedar Key, Florida, where the crab Eurytium limosum is an intermediate host, and the sea otter (Enhydra lutris) in central California. It was previously known as Spelotrema nicolli.

References

Literature cited
Kinsella, J.M. 1988. Comparison of helminths of rice rats, Oryzomys palustris, from freshwater and saltwater marshes in Florida. Proceedings of the Helminthological Society of Washington 55(2):275–280.
Mayer, K.A., Dailey, M.D. and Miller, M.A. 2003. Helminth parasites of the southern sea otter Enhydra lutris nereis in central California: abundance, distribution and pathology. Diseases of Aquatic Organisms 53:77–88.

Animals described in 1938
Plagiorchiida